Sharpe's Sword is a historical novel in the Richard Sharpe series by Bernard Cornwell. It is the fourth in the series, being first published in 1983, though the fourteenth chronologically.  Set in the summer of 1812 including the Battle of Salamanca on 22 July 1812, the story follows Sharpe and his friend Sergeant Harper involved in espionage while hunting down the sadistic and highly dangerous Colonel Philippe Leroux.

Plot summary
French Colonel Philippe Leroux and Captain Paul Delmas are fleeing from the King's German Legion toward Sharpe's Light Company. Leroux has extracted the secret identity of El Mirador, Britain's most important spy in Spain, from a priest he tortured. Leroux kills Delmas and assumes his identity and then allows himself to be captured by Sharpe and his men, knowing that the British would never exchange an imperial colonel. Sharpe covets Leroux's sword, a finely crafted, superbly balanced Klingenthal heavy cavalry sword. As Captain Delmas, Leroux gives his parole to Major Joseph Forrest. Whilst he is being escorted back to Wellington's headquarters, he kills his escort and escapes on horseback towards Salamanca. Lieutenant Colonel Windham pursues Leroux on horseback, but Leroux kills him. He gains sanctuary in one of the three French-controlled forts outside Salamanca, after Father Curtis protects him from the locals.

Sharpe confronts Curtis, who explains that the Frenchman is in fact Leroux, and that he was protecting the city's residents against Leroux's revenge if the city were to be recaptured by the French. Sharpe takes an instant dislike to Curtis, whom he thinks is sympathetic to the French. In Salamanca, Sharpe is introduced to the breathtakingly beautiful Marquesa de Casares el Grande y Melida Sadaba, and to Captain Lord Jack Spears. Wellington's army arrives at Salamanca as part of their manoeuvring against Marshal Marmont's army. Major Michael Hogan is both disturbed and relieved when Sharpe gives him a list Leroux dropped; the list was stolen from Hogan and contains the names of many of his spies. Many of them have recently been tortured and killed by Leroux.

Frustrated at his inability to bring Marmont to battle on his terms, Wellington finally sends two battalions, including the South Essex, against three French battalions in an effort to provoke Marmont, but Marmont does not rise to the bait.

Following the battle, Wellington places Sharpe and the Light Company under Hogan's command (as he and his men can identify Leroux) to ensure Leroux does not escape from the French forts. The Sixth Division attempts to storm the forts by surprise, but the French have been tipped off and slaughter the attackers. Sharpe is invited to a party by La Marquesa, but decides not to attend. Nevertheless Lord Spears later persuades him to go. As he prepares to leave the party, one of the servants takes him to a garden for a private meeting with La Marquesa. She obliquely claims to be El Mirador, and begs Sharpe to protect her from Leroux. They become lovers (her fat old husband being away suppressing a revolt in Brazil); after a while, she tells him her first name is Helena.

After several days, the forts are assaulted again and quickly surrender. Sharpe and his men examine the French prisoners several times, but cannot find Leroux. After searching the wounded, Sharpe allows them to be taken to the hospital in Salamanca. After Harper discovers a disemboweled French soldier who does not appear to have a full complement of intestines, Sharpe realises that Leroux has disguised himself as a French soldier with a severe stomach wound. Leaving his jacket behind (he had taken it off due to the heat), Sharpe and Harper race to the hospital, disrupting Leroux's rendezvous with a confederate who has brought a horse for him. Whilst searching the hospital, Harper discovers Leroux and a struggle ensues. Harper is pushed down a staircase and knocked unconscious. Sharpe comes running and engages in a sword duel with Leroux until the blade of Sharpe's sabre is shattered. Before Leroux can kill him, a sentry comes to his aid, and Leroux flees. Leroux shoots Sharpe in the stomach.

The Light Company eventually realise that Sharpe and Harper are missing and Major Hogan is alerted. A search of the hospital finds Harper still unconscious, but Sharpe cannot be found. When his discarded trousers are found, it is believed that he was mistaken for a dead French soldier and buried in a mass grave. In fact, he has been taken to the death ward run by Sergeant Connolley in the dank basement. Sharpe, unrecognised, drifts in and out of consciousness, but refuses to die from a wound that is almost always fatal. Hogan and Harper resume the search. They finally find Sharpe, but he is barely clinging to life. While the army moves on, Harper and Isabella (the peasant girl Harper rescued in the Battle of Badajoz) minister to Sharpe. In the meantime, Hogan assigns Lord Spears and some men to discreetly guard El Mirador.

With time on his hands, Harper buys a sword and spends many hours working on it. Isabella tells him that Sharpe is on the road to full recovery. When Lord Spears visits, Sharpe, he suggests that Lord Spears is protecting El Mirador. Sharpe's knowledge of this surprises Spears and makes him uncomfortable, but he nevertheless confirms Sharpe's hunch. As Sharpe recuperates, Harper returns to the Light Company.

A month later, Hogan sends Sharpe a letter telling him that the French will soon be returning to Salamanca and that he must pack and leave. That evening, Father Curtis returns Sharpe's stolen rifle. Curtis tells Sharpe that one of his correspondents in Paris has discovered that Leroux has a multi-lingual sister named Hélène. Curtis believes that this must be La Marquesa. Hogan does as well, and asks Sharpe to feed her false information that Wellington intends to speedily retreat to Portugal, while remaining with one division as rearguard to fool the French into believing otherwise. Sharpe realises that Curtis is El Mirador, not La Marquesa. Whilst hoping that she is not a French spy, he does deceive her later that evening.

Sharpe, still not fully healed, rejoins Wellington's army, riding on a horse that was a gift from La Marquesa. Marmont, suspecting already that Wellington is racing for the border, has these suspicions confirmed by a message from La Marquesa and he sends his army in pursuit, enabling Wellington to spring his trap, and the Battle of Salamanca ensues. The French left is destroyed by a British cavalry charge. Marmont and his deputy are both injured, so General Clausel assumes command. The British Fourth Division (including the South Essex) attack the French centre, but are repulsed by a French counterattack. Sharpe seeing the South Essex being pushed back and realising that they need to stand firm in order to channel the French columns into a killing ground for the Sixth Division, cannot resist joining the battle. He gets the wavering Light Company to stand their ground, and the French column is crushed. The French withdraw under the protection of their still undefeated right, hoping to cross the bridge at Alba de Tormes and escape. Wellington believes that a Spanish garrison holds the bridge and that the French are trapped. Unbeknownst to him, however, the Spanish have fled, believing that the British have been defeated, and the French retreat proceeds unopposed.

Lord Spears conducts a solo charge against the fleeing French and is fatally shot. Sharpe comes to his aid. Spears is dying and he wants Sharpe to tell his sister that he died honourably and he tells Sharpe that he wants to die because he has the Black Lion (syphilis), which results in an ugly death. He tells Sharpe that he knew that Hélène was a French spy and that he had told Hogan this some time ago. Sharpe realises that he is lying and suspects that he is the traitor in the British headquarters who stole Hogan's list. He threatens to kill Spears by stabbing him in the back (which would make it seem like he was killed whilst running away). Spears relents and confesses. He had not sold out Curtis because Leroux already knew. but he did give Leroux the book in which Curtis had written down the details of all the agents in his network. Spears had been hoping that in exchange Leroux would give him a night with his sister, but instead, he gave him back his parole and promised to provide his sister with a dowry when he returned to Paris. Then, at Spears' own request, Sharpe shoots him in the head. He reports to Hogan that Leroux has Curtis's book.

Sharpe, Harper and Hogan pursue the retreating French through the night in an effort to intercept Leroux. In the morning, they catch up to him, but he is able to outrun them and gain the protection of one of three French infantry squares. The French infantry subsequently ambush a British/King's German Legion cavalry charge against the French cavalry. Against extremely heavy odds, the enraged cavalry succeed in breaking the squares, albeit with heavy casualties.

Sharpe corners Leroux. Leroux shoots at him, missing Sharpe, but killing his horse. Sharpe shoots Leroux, wounding him in the leg and causing him to be thrown from his horse. Leroux refuses to fight, preferring to surrender. Sharpe forces him to fight, threatening to kill him anyway if he does not. In the ensuing sword duel, Sharpe kills Leroux and recovers Leroux's sword and the coded book.

La Marquesa is allowed to leave Salamanca, since it is not in the British interest to create a scandal involving a high-ranking Spanish aristocrat. She encounters Sharpe, and is not particularly upset when she learns that Sharpe killed her brother. Sharpe chooses to keep Harper's present, feeling it is lucky, while throwing LeRoux's sword - which, despite its beauty, has only been used for evil purposes - into the river.

Characters in "Sharpe's Sword"
Captain Richard Sharpe – Rifle Captain in the British army, Officer Commanding the Light Company of the South Essex Battalion.
Sergeant Patrick Harper – one of Sharpe's new group of Rifles, one of the Chosen Men
Major Michael Hogan – an Engineer, and Wellesley's head of intelligence.
Lieutenant General Wellington – commander of the British army in Spain.
Colonel Philippe Leroux – ruthless French officer of Napoleon’s imperial guard; sent to Spain as Napoleon’s emissary to find El Mirador and to destroy his spy network.
Hélène Leroux, La Marquesa de Casares el Grande y Melida Sadaba – expatriate French wife to a Spanish aristocrat general, and sister to Colonel Philippe Leroux.
The Reverend Doctor Patrick Curtis – an expatriate Irish priest and Rector of the Irish College and Professor of Astronomy and Natural History at the University of Salamanca. Known to the Spanish as Don Patricio Cortes. Runs a British spy network covering Spain and France under the code name El Mirador.
Captain Lord Jack Spears – British cavalry officer, works for Major Hogan as an exploring officer; chronic gambler and womaniser.
Marshal of France Auguste Marmont – commander of the French army in northern Spain.

Allusions to actual history
References are made to incidents during the Peninsular War and the 1812 Battle of Salamanca. Lieutenant General Wellington, Marshal of France Auguste Marmont, Patrick Curtis, Sergeant Connelley (in charge of the death ward in the novel) and Colquhoun Grant (exploring officer captured by Colonel Leroux) were all based on real historical figures of the same name, with limited dramatic licence taken.

Adaptations
Sharpe’s Sword has been adapted for TV as Sharpe's Sword, a 1995 British television drama, part of a series screened on the ITV network. While based on the novel, it is set a year later (1813) than the book and contains several other variations to the novel.

Publication history
1983, UK, HarperCollins , Pub date 1983, Paperback
1983, UK, HarperCollins , Pub date 18 May 1988, Paperback
1983, UK, HarperCollins , Pub date 1994, Paperback

References

External links
 Section from Bernard Cornwell's website on Sharpe's Sword

1983 British novels
Sword
Fiction set in 1812
William Collins, Sons books